To Love Again is a compilation album by American singer Diana Ross, released on February 17, 1981 by Motown Records. It featured both new recordings and previously-released material. The album was produced by Michael Masser. It reached number 32 in the USA (#16 R&B) and sold around 200,000 copies.

Overview 
Following the success of 1980's Diana, produced by Chic, Motown released this set in early 1981 consisting of old and newly recorded love songs by Ross and Masser.

"It's My Turn" was the main theme from a 1980 movie starring Michael Douglas and Jill Clayburgh and had been released both on the soundtrack album and as a single prior to the To Love Again compilation, becoming a top ten hit on the Billboard Hot 100. Two of the three new recordings, "One More Chance" and "Cryin' My Heart Out for You", were also issued as singles. The final new recording, "Stay With Me", was previously recorded by Roberta Flack in 1979. All tracks on side 2 of the original vinyl were previously released archive recordings by Ross and Masser from the 1970s.

To Love Again was to be Ross' last album of new material for Motown (before her return in 1989) after signing a $20 million contract with RCA.

In 2003 Motown/Universal Music re-released the album doubling the number of tracks with a range of assorted ballads from her back catalogue. Two of the tracks, "We're Always Saying Goodbye" and "Share Some Love", had been previously unreleased. It also marked the first time many of the songs appeared on compact disc.

Track listing

Original album
Side One
"It's My Turn" (Masser, Sager) - 3:58
From the 1980 original motion picture soundtrack It's My Turn
"Stay with Me" (Goffin, Masser) - 3:43
1981 recording
"One More Chance" (Goffin, Masser) - 4:24
1981 recording
"Cryin' My Heart Out for You" (Masser, Willis) - 3:49
1981 recording

Side Two
"Theme from Mahogany (Do You Know Where You're Going To)" (Goffin, Masser) - 3:26
From the 1975 original motion picture soundtrack Mahogany and 1976 album Diana Ross
"I Thought It Took a Little Time (But Today I Fell in Love)" (Masser, Sawyer) - 3:27
From the 1976 album Diana Ross
"To Love Again" (1981 Mix) (Goffin, Masser) - 4:08
From the 1978 album Ross. Originally recorded for Mahogany OST sessions, 1975
"No One's Gonna Be a Fool Forever" (Masser Sawyer) - 3:24
From the 1973 album Last Time I Saw Him
"Touch Me in the Morning" (Single mix, with a short fade as opposed to the 30-second fadeout of the original) (Masser, Miller) - 3:26
From the 1973 album Touch Me in the Morning

2003 edition
"It's My Turn" (Masser, Sager) - 3:58
"Stay with Me" (Goffin, Masser) - 3:43
"One More Chance" (Goffin, Masser) - 4:24
"Cryin' My Heart Out for You" (Masser, Willis) - 3:49
"Theme from Mahogany (Do You Know Where You're Going To)" (Single mix) (Goffin, Masser) - 3:26
"I Thought It Took a Little Time (But Today I Fell in Love)" (Masser, Sawyer) - 3:27
"To Love Again" (1978 Mix) (Goffin, Masser) - 4:11
"No One's Gonna Be a Fool Forever" (Single mix) (Masser, Sawyer) - 3:21
"Touch Me in the Morning" (Masser, Miller) - 3:58
"Love Me" (Baird, Fekaris, Zesses) - 2:55
From Last Time I Saw Him
"Stop, Look, Listen (To Your Heart)" (Alternate mix created for this edition) (Duet with Marvin Gaye) (T. Bell, Creed) - 2:58
From the 1973 album Diana & Marvin
"Together" (Single mix) (Masser, Sawyer) - 3:18
1975 non-album single B-side. Remixed version included on Ross
"After You" (Masser, Miller) - 4:13
From Mahogany and Diana Ross
"Too Shy to Say" (Wonder) - 3:17
From the 1977 album Baby It's Me
"Come In from the Rain" (Manchester, Sager) - 4:02
From Baby It's Me
"Never Say I Don't Love You" (Patterson, Wright) - 3:53
From Ross
"Share Some Love" (Patterson, Wright) - 4:07
Previously unreleased recording
"Dreaming of You" (Duet with Lionel Richie) (McClary, Richie) - 4:34
From the 1981 original motion picture soundtrack Endless Love
"Endless Love" (Duet with Lionel Richie) (Richie) - 4:28
From Endless Love OST
"We're Always Saying Goodbye" (Etlinger, Miller) - 2:31
Previously unreleased recording

Charts

Album

Singles

References

1981 compilation albums
Motown compilation albums
Diana Ross compilation albums